Danilo Di Vincenzo (18 April 1968 in Rome – 10 December 1996 in Orvieto) was an Italian footballer. He played as a striker.  He played in Serie B with Cosenza and A.S.D. Castel di Sangro Calcio and in Serie C with various other teams, in particular Giulianova. He died on the morning of 10 December 1996 in a car accident alongside Castel di Sangro teammate Pippo Biondi.

Career
1994 Giulianova  ? (30)
1996 Castel di Sangro 9 (3)

Notes

External links
 
 

1968 births
1996 deaths
Italian footballers
A.S.D. Castel di Sangro Calcio players
Road incident deaths in Italy
Association football forwards